The University of Hawaii at Mānoa (University of Hawaii—Mānoa, UH Mānoa, Hawai'i, or simply UH) is a public land-grant research university in Mānoa, a neighborhood of Honolulu, Hawaii. It is the flagship campus of the University of Hawaiʻi system and houses the main offices of the system. Most of the campus occupies the eastern half of the mouth of Mānoa Valley, with the John A. Burns School of Medicine located adjacent to the Kakaʻako Waterfront Park.

U.H. offers over 200 degree programs across 17 colleges and schools. It is accredited by the WASC Senior College and University Commission and governed by the Hawaii State Legislature and a semi-autonomous board of regents. It also a member of the Association of Pacific Rim Universities.

Mānoa is classified among "R1: Doctoral Universities – Very high research activity". It is a land-grant university that also participates in the sea-grant, space-grant, and sun-grant research consortia; it is one of only four such universities in the country (Oregon State University, Cornell University and Pennsylvania State University are the others).

Notable U.H. alumni include Robert Ballard, Richard Parsons, and the parents of Barack Obama, Barack Obama Sr. and Stanley Ann Dunham. Forty-four percent of Hawaii's state senators and 51 percent of its state representatives are U.H. graduates.

History

Founding 
The University of Hawaiʻi at Mānoa was founded in 1907 as a land-grant college of agriculture and mechanical arts establishing "the College of Agriculture and Mechanic Arts of the Territory of Hawaiʻi and to Provide for the Government and Support Thereof".  The bill Maui Senator William J. Huelani Coelho through the initiatives of Native Hawaiian legislators, a newspaper editor, petition of an Asian American bank cashier, and a president of Cornell University, was introduced into the Territorial Legislature March 1, 1907 as Act 24, and signed into law March 25, 1907 by the Governor George Carter, which officially established the College of Agriculture and Mechanic Arts of the Territory of Hawaiʻi under a five-member Board of Regents on the corner of Beretania and Victoria streets (now the location of the Honolulu Museum of Art School). Regular classes began on September 14, 1908, with John Gilmore as the university's first president.

In September 1912 it moved to its present location in Mānoa Valley on 90 acres of land that had been cobbled together from leased and private lands and was renamed the College of Hawaii. William Kwai Fong Yap, an cashier at Bank of Hawaii, and a group of citizens petitioned the Hawaii Territorial Legislature six years later for university status which led to another renaming finally to the University of Hawaiʻi on April 30, 1919, with the addition of the College of Arts and Sciences and College of Applied Science.

In the years following, the university expanded to include more than 300 acres. In 1931 the Territorial Normal School was absorbed into the university, becoming Teacher's College, now the College of Education.

20th century 
The university continued its growth throughout the 1930s and 1940s increasing from 232 to 402 acres.  The number of buildings grew from 4 to 17. Following the attack on Pearl Harbor in December 1941, classes were suspended for two months while the Corps of Engineers occupied much of the campus, including the Teacher's College, for various purposes.  The university's ROTC program was put into active duty, which made the campus resemble a military school. When classes resumed on February 11, 1942, about half of the student and faculty body left to enter the war or military service. Students, who returned to campus, found classes cancelled due to lack of faculty and were required to carry gas masks to classes and bomb shelters were kept at a ready. Once the war was over, student enrollment grew faster than the university had faculty and space for.

In 1947, the university opened an extension center in Hilo on Hawaiʻi Island in the old Hilo Boarding School. In 1951, Hilo Center was designated the University of Hawaii Hilo Branch before its reorganization by an act of the Hawaiʻi State Legislature in 1970.

By the 1950s, enrollment increased to more than 5,000 students, and the university had expanded to include a Graduate Division, College of Education, College of Engineering, College of Business Administration, College of Tropical Agriculture, and College of Arts and Sciences.

When Hawaiʻi was granted statehood in 1959, the university became a constitutional agency rather than a legislative agency with the Board of Regents having oversight over the university. Enrollment continued to grow to 19,000 at the university through the 1960s and the campus became nationally recognized in research and graduate education.

In 1965, the state legislature created a system of community colleges and placed it within the university at the recommendations of the Department of Health, Education and Welfare's report on higher education in Hawaii and UH President Thomas H. Hamilton. By the end of the 1960s, the University of Hawaiʻi was very different from what it had since its beginning. It had become larger and with the addition of the community colleges, a broad range of activities extending from vocational education to community college education, which were all advanced through research and postdoctoral training.

The university was renamed the University of Hawaiʻi at Mānoa to distinguish it from other campuses in the University of Hawaiʻi System in 1972.

Organization and administration 
The University of Hawaiʻi is governed by an 11-member board of regents who are nominated by the Regents Candidate Advisory Council, appointed by the governor, and appointed by the State of Hawai'i legislature. The board also appoints the University of Hawai'i president, who also serves as the chief executive of the University of Hawaiʻi at Mānoa.

Presidents and chancellors 
With the exception of the university's first semester, there has always been either a president, interim president, or chancellor. From 1907 to 1965, before the Hawaiʻi State Legislature created the University of Hawaiʻi System, which incorporated the technical and community colleges into the university, the president's role expanded to include oversight of all system campuses, with chancellors taking responsibility for individual campuses. As a result, the president has filled the role of chancellor at the university in addition to serving as president of the University of Hawaiʻi System. The chancellor's position was created in 1974 and would be abolished in 1984, with Albert J. Simone becoming acting president on June 1, 1984.

In 2001, the position of chancellor was recreated by then-UH System president Evan Dobelle over conflict of interest concerns. It was again abolished in April 2019.

Presidents
1907–1908: Willis T. Pope (acting)
1908–1913: John W. Gilmore
1913–1914: John Donaghho (acting)
1914–1927: Arthur L. Dean
1927–1941: David L. Crawford
1941–1942: Arthur R. Keller (acting)
1942–1955: Gregg M. Sinclair
1955–1957: Paul S. Bachman
1957–1958: Willard Wilson (acting)
1958–1963: Laurence H. Snyder
1963–1968: Thomas H. Hamilton
1968–1969: Robert W. Hiatt (acting)
1969: Richard S. Takasaki (acting)
1969–1974: Harlan Cleveland
1974–1984: See list of chancellors below
1984–1992: Albert J. Simone
1992–1993: Paul C. Yuen (acting)
1993 - 2001: Kenneth P. Mortimer
2001–2017: See list of chancellors below
2017–present: David Lassner (current)

Chancellors
2001–2002: Deane Neubauer (interim)
2002–2005: Peter Englert 
2005–2007: Denise Konan (interim)
2007–2012: Virginia Hinshaw 
2012–2014: Tom Apple 
2014–2017: Robert Bley-Vroman (interim)

Academics

UH Mānoa, the flagship campus of the University of Hawaiʻi System, is a four-year research university consisting of 17 schools and colleges. In addition to undergraduate and graduate degrees in the School of Architecture, School of Earth Science and Technology, the College of Arts, Languages, and Letters, the Shidler College of Business, the College of Education, and the College of Engineering, the university also maintains professional schools in law and medicine.

Together, the colleges and schools of the university offer bachelor's degrees in 93 fields of study, master's degrees in 84 fields, doctoral degrees in 51 fields, first professional degrees in five fields, post-baccalaureate degrees in three fields, 28 undergraduate certification programs, and 29 graduate certification programs.

College of Tropical Agriculture & Human Resources
Originally called the College of Agriculture and Mechanic Arts of the Territory of Hawaiʻi and formerly the College of Applied Sciences, the College of Tropical Agriculture & Human Resources (CTAHR) is the founding college of the university. Programs of the college focuses on tropical agriculture, food science and human nutrition, textiles and clothing, and human resources,

College of Education
The college was established as the Honolulu Training School in 1895 to prepare and train teachers and then Territorial Normal and Training School after Hawai'i became a territory in 1905. As the school outgrew its location on the Punchbowl side of Honolulu, a new campus was to be constructed on the corner of University Avenue and Metcalf Street. The first two buildings constructed by the Territorial Department of Public instruction became known as Wist Hall and Wist Annex 1. The normal school was eventually merged into the University of Hawai'i in 1931 as the Teacher's College. In 1959, the name was changed to the College of Education.

College of Arts, Languages & Letters
The College of Arts, Languages, and Letters (CALL) is the newest and largest college at the university. It was created following the dissolution of the College of Arts and Science and the merger of the Colleges of Arts and Humanities, Languages, Linguistics, and Literature (LLL) and the School of Pacific and Asian Studies. The college's core focus is the study of arts, humanities, and languages with a particular focus on Hawaiʻi, the Pacific, and Asia Studies.

Shidler College of Business

The College of Business Administration was established in 1949 with programs in accounting, finance, real estate, industrial relations, and marketing. The college was renamed the Shidler College of Business on September 6, 2006, after real-estate executive Jay Shidler, an alumnus of the college, who donated $25 million to the college.

Nancy Atmospera-Walch School of Nursing
The School of Nursing was established in 1951, even though courses in nursing had been offered since 1932 with a partnership with Queen's Hospital School of Nursing.

Honors program
The UH Mānoa offers an Honors Program to provide additional resources for students preparing to apply to professional school programs. Students complete core curriculum courses for their degrees in the Honors Program, maintain at least a cumulative 3.2 grade-point average in all courses, and complete a senior thesis project.

Library

The University of Hawaiʻi at Mānoa Library, which provides access to 3.4 million volumes, 50,000 journals, and thousands of digitized documents, is one of the largest academic research libraries in the United States, ranking 86th in parent institution investment among 113 North American members of the Association of Research Libraries.

Rankings

The National Science Foundation ranked UH Mānoa 45th among 395 public universities for Research and Development (R&D) expenditures in fiscal year 2014.

According to U.S. News & World Reports rankings for 2021, UH Mānoa was tied at 170th overall and 159th for "Best Value" among national universities; tied at 83rd among public universities; and tied at 145th for its undergraduate engineering program among schools that confer doctorates.

Distance learning
The university offers over 50 distance learning courses, using technology to replace either all or a portion of class instruction. Students interact with their instructors and peers from different locations to further develop their education.

Research

With extramural grants and contracts of $436 million in 2012, research at UH Mānoa relates to Hawaii's physical landscape, its people and their heritage. The geography facilitates advances in marine biology, oceanography, underwater robotic technology, astronomy, geology and geophysics, agriculture, aquaculture and tropical medicine. Its heritage, the people and its close ties to the Asian and Pacific region create a favorable environment for study and research in the arts, genetics, intercultural relations, linguistics, religion and philosophy.

According to the National Science Foundation, UH Mānoa spent $276 million on research and development in 2018, ranking it 84th in the nation. Extramural funding increased from $368 million in FY 2008 to nearly $436 million in FY 2012. Research grants increased from $278 million in FY 2008 to $317 million in FY 2012. Nonresearch awards totaled $119 million in FY 2012. Overall, extramural funding increased by 18%.

For the period of July 1, 2012 to June 20, 2013, the School of Ocean and Earth Science and Technology (SOEST) received the largest amount of extramural funding among the Mānoa units at $92 million. SOEST was followed by the medical school at $57 million, the College of Natural Sciences and the University of Hawaiʻi Cancer Center at $24 million, the Institute for Astronomy at $22 million, CTARH at $18 million, and the College of Social Sciences and the College of Education at $16 million.

Across the UH system, the majority of research funding comes from the Department of Health and Human Services, the Department of Defense, the Department of Education, the National Science Foundation, the Department of Commerce, and the National Aeronautics Space Administration (NASA). Local funding comes from Hawaii government agencies, non-profit organizations, health organizations and business and other interests.

The $150-million medical complex in Kakaʻako opened in the spring of 2005. The facility houses a biomedical research and education center that attracts significant federal funding and private sector investment in biotechnology and cancer research and development.

Research (broadly conceived) is expected of every faculty member at UH Mānoa. Also, according to the Carnegie Foundation, UH Mānoa is an RU/VH (very high research activity) level research university.

In 2013, UH Mānoa was elected to membership in the Association of Pacific Rim Universities, the leading consortium of research universities for the region. APRU represents 45 premier research universities—with a collective 2 million students and 120,000 faculty members—from 16 economies.

Demographics

U.H. is the fourth most diverse university in the U.S. According to the 2010 report of the Institutional Research Office, a plurality of students at the University of Hawaiʻi at Mānoa are Caucasian, making up a quarter of the student body. The next largest groups were Japanese Americans (13%), native or part native Hawaiians (13%), Filipino Americans (8%), Chinese Americans (7%) and mixed race (12%). Pacific Islanders and other ethnic groups make up the balance (22%).

Student life

Student housing
All UH Mānoa residence halls are coeducational. These include the Hale Aloha Complex, Johnson Hall, Hale Laulima, and Hale Kahawai. Suite-style residence halls include Frear Hall and Gateway House. First year undergraduates who choose to live on campus live in the traditional residence halls.

Two apartment-style complexes are Hale Noelani and Hale Wainani. Hale Noelani consists of five three-story buildings and Hale Wainani has two high rise buildings (one 14-story and one 13-story) and two low-rise buildings. Second-year undergraduates and above are permitted to live in Hale Noelani and Hale Wainani.

The university reserves some low-rise units for graduate students and families.

Charles H. Atherton YMCA
The University of Hawai'i at Mānoa and the YMCA of Honolulu has enjoyed a close and robust partnership since the university's founding. Beginning informally in 1908, the YMCA held bible classes and discussions at the University of Hawai'i, when it was the College of Hawai'i. In 1912, the YMCA of Honolulu followed the college to Mānoa valley and continued its work in Hawai'i Hall.  In 1922, the relationship was formalized and it was one of the largest and most active groups on the university's campus, including hosting events for high school and incoming students.

In 1932, through funding by the Atherton family, the YMCA moved across the street to a three-story cement building on University Avenue. The building, called the Charles H. Atherton House or the "Pink Building", in addition to being the center for YMCA activities, also served as student housing and dining hall. In 1995, the YMCA purchased the Mary Atherton House next door to provide additional residential and activity space.

In 2017, the Atherton building was sold to the university and University of Hawai'i Foundation. Today, its main offices are located in the Queen Lili’uokalani Center for Student Services building on the University of Hawaiʻi at Mānoa, where they continue serve UH students and families throughout Hawai'i.

The Atherton building has since been closed and renovations began July 2021 to turn the Pink Building into student housing and an innovation center.

Associated Students of the University of Hawai'i

The Associated Students of the University of Hawai'i at Manoa (ASUH) is the undergraduate student government representing the 10,000+ full-time, classified, undergraduate students at the University of Hawaiʻi at Mānoa. ASUH was founded in 1910 as the Associated Students of Hawai'i and was chartered by the University of Hawai'i Board of Regents in 1912.

Off-campus

The Lyon Arboretum is the only tropical arboretum belonging to any US University. The Arboretum, located in Mānoa Valley, was established in 1918 by the Hawaiian Sugar Planters' Association to demonstrate watershed restoration and test tree species for reforestation, as well as to collect living plants of economic value. In 1953, it became part of the University of Hawaiʻi at Mānoa. Its over 15,000 accessions focus primarily on the monocot families of palms, gingers, heliconias, bromeliads and aroids.
The Waikiki Aquarium, founded in 1904, is the third-oldest public aquarium in the United States. A part of the University of Hawaiʻi since 1919, the Aquarium is located next to a living reef on the Waikiki shoreline.

Athletics

The University of Hawaiʻi at Mānoa competes in NCAA Division I, the only Hawaii school to do so. It competes in the Mountain West Conference for football only and the Big West Conference for most other sports. UH competes in the Mountain Pacific Sports Federation in men's and women's swimming and diving, and indoor track and field while the coed and women's sailing teams are members of the Pacific Coast Collegiate Sailing Conference.

Men's teams are known as Rainbow Warriors, and women's teams are called Rainbow Wahine. "Wahine" means "woman" in Hawaiian. They are most notable for men's and women's basketball, volleyball, baseball, and football programs. The university won the 2004 Intercollegiate Sailing Association National Championships. The women's volleyball program won NCAA championships in 1982, 1983 and 1987. The men's volleyball won an NCAA championship in 2021. The men's volleyball team had previously won an NCAA championship title game in 2002, but the title was later vacated due to violations.

The principal sports venues are Clarence T. C. Ching Athletics Complex, Stan Sheriff Center, Les Murakami Stadium, Rainbow Wahine Softball Stadium, and the Duke Kahanamoku Aquatic Complex.

The university's athletic budget in FY 2008–2009 was $29.6 million.

Notable alumni and faculty

Notable alumni of the University of Hawaiʻi at Mānoa include:
Daniel Inouye, (B.A. 1950), U.S. Senator
Daniel Akaka, (B.A. 1952, M.Ed. 1966), U.S. Senator
Patsy Mink, (B.A. 1948), former U.S. Congresswoman
Neil Abercrombie, (M.A. 1964, PhD 1974) former governor of Hawaiʻi
Robert Ballard, (M.S. 1966), oceanographer
Rick Blangiardi, (M.A 1973), 15th mayor of Honolulu
Robert Blust, (B.A. 1967, PhD 1974), linguist and Austronesian language expert
Richard Parsons, (B.A. 1968), businessman, former chairman of Citigroup
Mazie Hirono, (B.A. 1970), U.S. Senator
Ana Paula Höfling, dance researcher and academic
Mark Takai, (B.A. 1989, M.P.H. 1991), U.S. Congressman
Tammy Duckworth, (B.A. 1990), U.S. Senator
Janet Mock, (B.A. 2004), writer
Georgia Engel, (B.A. 1967), actress
Esther T. Mookini, linguist and translator
Sonny Ganaden, (J.D. 2006), lawyer, journalist and Member of the Hawaii House of Representatives from the 30th District; later a faculty member 
Robert Huey, Japanologist
Michael Savage, (M.S., 1970, M.A., 1972), author
Robyn Ah Mow-Santos, 1996, USA Volleyball Team member and former Olympian
Arsenio Balisacan, PhD, 1985, Socioeconomic Planning Secretary and Director General of the National Economic and Development Authority of the Philippines
Colleen Hanabusa, (B.A. 1970, M.A. 1975, J.D. 1977), former U.S. Congresswoman
Linda Taira, (B.A. 1978), former chief congressional correspondent for CNN
Nainoa Thompson, (B.A. 1986) navigator and former trustee of Kamehameha Schools
Mark Takai, (B.A. 1990, M.P.H. 1993) U.S. Congressman
Jay H. Shidler, (B.B.A. 1968) entrepreneur and benefactor of the Shidler College of Business
Ann Dunham, (PhD 1992) American anthropologist and mother of President Barack Obama
Pat Saiki, (B.S. 1952), former member of the U.S. House of Representatives and teacher
Ed Lu, Postdoctoral fellow, former NASA astronaut
Corinne K. A. Watanabe (J.D. 1971), judge

Notable faculty of the University of Hawaiʻi at Mānoa include:
Lee Altenberg, theoretical biologist
Tom Apple, physical chemist
Kim Binsted, computer scientist
Lyle Campbell, linguist
Monique Chyba, mathematician
Edward DeLong, atmospheric science, member of the National Academy of Sciences
Milton Diamond, anatomist
Mike Douglass, urban planner
David Cameron Duffy, conservation biologist
Kathy Ferguson, political scientist
Ruth Haas, mathematician
Richard S. Hamilton, mathematician, member of the National Academy of Sciences
Bruce Houghton, vulcanologist
Hope A. Ishii, geophysicist
Reece Jones, geographer, Guggenheim Fellow
Kenneth Y. Kaneshiro, evolutionary biologist
David Karl, microbiologist and oceanographer, member of the National Academy of Sciences
Klaus Keil, geophysicist
Patrick Vinton Kirch, archaeologist, member of the National Academy of Sciences 
Denise Konan, economist
Michelle Manes, mathematician
Margaret McFall-Ngai, biologist, member of the National Academy of Sciences
Karen Jean Meech, astronomer
Michael J. Shapiro, political scientist
Manfred Steger, sociologist
Steven M. Stanley, paleontologist and evolutionary biologist, member of the National Academy of Sciences
Stephen Vargo, marketing
Bin Wang, meteorologist
Ryuzo Yanagimachi, biologist, member of the National Academy of Sciences

Notable former faculty members include:
Isabella Abbott, ethnobotanist
Glenn Cannon, theatre
Hampton L. Carson, evolutionary biologist
Ruth D. Gates, marine biologist
George Herbig, astronomer, member of the National Academy of Sciences
W. Wesley Peterson, computer scientist and mathematician
Joseph Rock, botanist
Shunzo Sakamaki, Japanese studies
Richard Schmidt, linguist
Harold St. John, botanist
Satosi Watanabe, theoretical physicist

Art on campus

Campus art includes:
The John Young Museum of Art
The Jean Charlot collection at the Hamilton Library
Murals by Jean Charlot: The Relation of Man and Nature in Old Hawaii (1949), Commencement (1953), Inspiration, Study, Creativity (1967), and Mayan Warrior (1970)
Sculptures by Edward M. Brownlee: Maka Io (Hawk's Eye) (1984), and an untitled reflecting pool with copper and iron sculpture (1962)
Sculptures by Bumpei Akaji: Maka a e Ike Aku i ke Awawa Uluwehi i na Kuahiwi o Mānoa (Glowing Eyes Looking at the Lush Valley in the Mountains of Mānoa) (1979), Manaoio (Confidence and Faith) (1981), and VVV (1995)
Murals by Mataumu Toelupe Alisa: Backyard Cooking (1977), and Hula (1982)
Works by Shige Yamada: Alae a Hina (Mud Hen of Hina) (1977), and Rainbows (1997)
Sculptures by Greg Clurman: Sumotori (Sumo Wrestler, 1975), and Hina o na Lani (Mother of the Universe, 1975)
Wa (Harmony), ceramic sculpture by Wayne A. Miyata, 1982
Founders' Gate, stone arches by Ralph Fishbourne, 1933
Neumes o Hawaii, ceramic tile bench and planter by Suzi Pleyte Horan, 1976
Chance Meeting, cast bronze sculpture by George Segal, 1991
Three untitled murals by Frank M. Moore, 1919
Silent Sound, brass bas relief by Paul Vanders, 1973
The Net Effect, cast bronze sculpture by Fred H. Roster, 1982
Rainbow Spirit, painted copper sculpture by Babs Miyano-Young, 1997
Untitled ceramic wall sculpture by Isami Enomoto, 1964
Gate of Hope, red-orange painted steel sculpture by Alexander Liberman, 1972
Divers, red brass sculpture by Robert Stackhouse, 1991
Krypton 1 x 6 x 18, mixed media monolith by Bruce Hopper, 1973
Wisdom of the East, fresco by Affandi, 1967
Pulelehua (Kamehameha Butterfly), ceramic mural by Bob Flint, 1986
Makahiki Hookupu (Harvest Celebration), charcoal and sanguine mural by Juliette May Fraser, 1938
Nana i ke Kumu (Look to the Source), batik triptych by Yvonne Cheng, 1978
GovDocs, mural by Judith Yamauchi, 1982
Anuenue #2 (Rainbow #2), three-part woven wall hanging by Reiko Brandon, 1977
Seated Amida Buddha, 15th-century Japanese wood sculpture with gold over black lacquer
Epitaph, bronze, steel and granite sculpture by Harold Tovish, 1970
Grid/Scape, terrazzo and aluminum landscape sculpture by Mamoru Sato, 1982
The Great Manoa Crack Seed Caper, by Lanny Little and student assistants, 1981
The Bilger Frescoes representing Air, Water, Earth and Fire by Juliette May Fraser, David Asherman, Sueko Matsueda Kimura and Richard Lucier, 1951–1953
The Fourth Sign, painted steel sculpture by Tony Smith, 1976
Varney Circle Fountain, by Henry H. Rempel and Cornelia McIntyre Foley, 1934
Spirit of Loyalty, cast glass sculpture Rick Mills, 1995
Mind and Heart, metal sculpture by Frank Sheriff, 1995
To the Nth Power, steel sculpture by Charles W. Watson, 1971
Bamboo Forest, mural painted on bricks by Padraic Shigetani, 1978
Peace Pole, painted obelisk, 1995
Hawaiʻi Kaʻu Kumu (Hawaiʻi My Teacher), pair of murals by Calley O'Neill and assistants, 1982
Untitled painted photorealist mural by Donald Yatomi, 1990
Arctic Portals, stainless steel sculpture by Jan-Peter Stern, 1975
Adam, bronze sculpture by Satoru Abe, 1954

These artworks are off the main campus:
East-West Center gallery
Pleiades, overhead installation of mounted prisms at the Institute for Astronomy by Otto Piene, 1976
Shadow of Progress mixed media sculpture at the Pacific Biomedical Research Center by Rebecca Steen, 1990
Woven wall hanging at KHET (2350 Dole Street) by Jean Williams, 1972

See also

Hawai`i Institute of Marine Biology
Hawaii Ocean Time-series (HOT)
University of Hawaiʻi Marching Band

Notes

References

External links

1907 establishments in Hawaii
Buildings and structures in Honolulu
Education in Honolulu
Flagship universities in the United States
Land-grant universities and colleges
University of Hawaii
Schools accredited by the Western Association of Schools and Colleges
Manoa
Educational institutions established in 1907